This is a list of the current Knights (men) and Members (women) of the Swedish order of chivalry, the Royal Order of the Seraphim.

Colour Pattern

Europe

Royal family of Sweden

Austria

Belgium

Bulgaria

Croatia

Denmark

Estonia

Finland

France

Germany

Greece

Iceland

Italy

Latvia

Lithuania

Luxembourg

Netherlands

Norway

Poland

Portugal

Romania

Slovakia

Spain

Turkey

Ukraine

United Kingdom

The Americas

Brazil

Chile

Mexico

Africa

Ethiopia

Asia

Bhutan

Brunei

Indonesia

Iran

Japan

Jordan

South Korea

Thailand

See also 
 List of Knights of the Royal Order of the Seraphim

Sources 
 Per Nordenvall, Kungliga Serafimerorden 1748-1998 (1998)

References 

 
Seraphim
Knights of the Royal Order of the Seraphim